D- means:

 Placed before a U.S. state, usually in parentheses, indicates the person it applies to is a Democratic Party politician of that state. "R-" is used for the Republican Party.
 An academic grade given by certain institutions.  Slightly better than an F and slightly worse than a D. See Grade (education).
 A prefix signifying chirality of a molecule

See also
 Rep.
 Sen.